hosseini village is a village in rey city, Qaleh Now District, Ray County, Tehran Province, Iran. At the 2006 census, its population was 2,542, in 645 families.

References 

Populated places in Ray County, Iran